Straley is a surname. Notable people with the surname include: 

Bruce Straley, American game director, artist, and designer
John Straley (born 1953), American poet and author of detective fiction
Sam Straley, American actor

See also
Staley (surname)